Capillary aneurysms are flesh-colored solitary lesions, resembling an intradermal nevus, which may suddenly grow larger and darker and become blue-black or black as a result of thrombosis.

See also
Skin lesion

References

Dermal and subcutaneous growths